Elections to the Iowa House of Representatives were held on November 3, 2020.

In October 2020, The Washington Post identified this state election as one of eight whose outcomes could affect partisan balance during post-census redistricting.

Predictions

Polling

Generic Republican vs. Generic Democrat

Results summary

Closest races 
Seats where the margin of victory was under 10%:
  gain
  gain
 
 
 
   
  gain
  gain
  gain
 
  
  gain

Summary of results by State House District

Notes

Partisan clients

See also
 2020 Iowa elections

References

External links
 

House of Representatives
Iowa House of Representatives elections
Iowa House